Namita Dubey is an indian actress known for her work in Sony TV's Bade Bhaiyya Ki Dulhania and Pooja Hooda in Colors TV's Bepannah.

Filmography

Television

Films

Web series

References

Living people
Indian soap opera actresses
Indian television actresses
Actresses in Hindi television
1990 births